
Laguna Corani is a lake in the Chapare Province, Cochabamba Department, Bolivia. Its surface area is 18 km².

References 

Lakes of Cochabamba Department